Roscoe James Irwin (born 21 February 1982) is a singer-songwriter, trumpetist and arranger/composer from Melbourne, Australia. He attended Blackburn High School known for its music.

Biography

Born to a classical soprano mother, and a folk loving father, Irwin was raised in the Dandenong Ranges in Victoria. Irwin's musical life was born at home. At age 9, he was welcomed into a Brady Bunch-esque step-family of brass players, pianists and conductors. Learning from his brother-in-law, Irwin showed early talent as an instrumentalist, and very quickly developed as a jazz trumpet player.  Influenced by the greats like Miles Davis, Clifford Brown and Louis Armstrong. At age 15, Irwin was already working professionally as a jazz and commercial trumpeter, playing pubs, restaurants and clubs in his hometown Melbourne.

Since those early days, Irwin has never looked back. Aside from his solo career, he has ended up working as a multi-instrumentalist and sideman with artists like Megan Washington, Brooke Fraser, Magnolia and Tinpan Orange. His involvement with seminal Australian bands The Cat Empire and The Bamboos, to his highly ambitious compositions and arrangements that have been performed by countless big bands and orchestras have cemented him in the Australian music industry. Most recently he has also added co-writer, arranger and producer credits to this list, for bands and artists like Lanu, Felix Riebl, The Cat Empire, and The Bamboos.

Solo Project

Having suffered a clean break of heart in 2009, Irwin retreated to the Canada mountain town of Nelson. After three weeks of late autumn cold, Irwin returned with a pocket full of songs, and soon after recorded 'The Hunting Road', with producer John Castle (The Bamboos, Megan Washington) at The Shed studio in Melbourne. His debut album,"The Hunting Road" was released through Vitamin Records on 5 September 2011.

Irwin then went on to independently release his first EP 'Wasted' in 2013, again with producer John Castle. This time however it was recorded at the newly built Pick and Mix Studios in the Dandenong ranges with musician and producer Ben Edgar. The artwork for this release was created by Melbourne digital artist Kate Moon, the two collaborated and created a world of imagery inspired by his appreciation for the work of writers such as Kazuo Koike and Haruki Murakami. This art work is to be featured in the next 2 of Irwin's releases.

He has toured the Australia playing his own solo shows and in support of some of Australia's great musical success stories such as Vance Joy, Ella Hooper, and Julia Stone.

Band members
Roscoe James Irwin – Vocals, Keys
Ben Edgar – Guitar, and Guitar
Leonard Grigoryan-Guitar and Guitar
Alex Burkoy – Mandolin and Guitar
Danny Farrugia – Kit and Percussion

Discography
1000 Nights Single (May 2011)
The Hunting Road (September 2011)
"Wasted" (September 2013)
 "1941" (October 2014)
"The Wild" (March 2015)

Other Projects
The Cat Empire
The Bamboos

References

External links
Facebook 
Alberts Music Profile 

Australian singer-songwriters
1984 births
Living people
21st-century Australian singers
People educated at Blackburn High School
Musicians from Melbourne